The 1958 Grand National was the 112th renewal of the Grand National horse race that took place at Aintree near Liverpool, England, on 29 March 1958.

From an initial entry of 56  The field of 31 runners competed for record prize money of nearly £14,000. The race was won by 18/1 shot Mr. What, by a distance of 30 lengths. The eight-year-old was ridden by jockey Arthur Freeman and trained by Tom Taaffe Sr., and became the fifth Irish winner of the Grand National since the Second World War.

Race Card
Thirty two runners were declared to run with Top Twenty, to be ridden by Shortt being withdrawn on the day of the race after bursting a blood vessel when finishing fith in the Topham Chase two days before the National. There were no late jockey changes from those declared on the race card.

Mr What's trainer Tom Taffe left it until five days before the race to engage Arthur Freeman, as he had wanted his son Tosse to partner his entry. However Tosse was expected to ride the highly fancied Sam Brownthorn and with options for a replacement running out, Taffe booked Freeman, who himself had been left without a mount after losing the ride on Athenian to Derrick Ancil, having two other engagements withdrawn, and losing his standby slot on Never Say When as the injured Stan Mellor was passed fit a week before the race. Although Tosse Taffe did become available to ride forty-eight hours before the race when Sam Brownthorn was withdrawn, Taffe senior stuck to his booking, leaving Taffe junior to partner Brookling instead.

Finishing order

Broadcasting and Media

With Mrs Topham continuing to refuse to allow the BBC to broadcast the race on Television, coverage of the race remained restricted to a thirty-minute radio broadcast at 3pm on the BBC Light Programme. This was the twenty-seventh consecutive renewal, dating back to 1927 to be covered by BBC radio.

Filming the race remained the preserve of the two major newsreel services, Pathe and Movietone with both rapidly releasing their newsreels of the race as early as that evening in some local cinemas as a special in its own right, rather than as part of their normal newsreel service.

The Daily Mirror, Daily Herald, Daily Express and Daily Mail all carried extensive previews of the race

Non-finishers

Pathe's footage of the race shows that Comedian's Folly refused twice at the sixth fence {Becher's Brook} clearing it only at the third attempt, while Sentina also appears to fall rather than being brought down.

Post Race
Trainer Neville Crump told the press after the race that his Goosander would not be entered again for the National. "I don't say that he will never run at Aintree again, but he obviously doesn't stay the full National distance." he stated after the horse finished a tired fifth.

Jockey Peter Pickford advised the same of Hart Royal, stating "He just hated the big fences all the way and I could never get anywhere near the leaders."

Bill Rees expressed similar sentiments of Colledge Master whom he said "Made a hole big enough in the seventeenth fence to walk through."

Derrick Ancil reported that his mount, Athenian's race ended at the nineteenth fence, stuck with "Forelegs on one side and hind legs on the other."

Mrs Topham was forced to defend the race after a combination of poor weather and moving from a Friday to a Saturday led to a notciably reduced attendance in the enclosures and out in the extremes of the course. However, she blamed the Tote, claiming that their "4s minimum stake to get into the enclosures puts people off. If the Tote would reduce this to 2s then people would come flocking back, not just to the Grand National but to all race courses."

References

 1958
Grand National
Grand National
20th century in Lancashire
Grand National